Jack Darling (born 13 June 1992) is an Australian rules footballer who plays for the West Coast Eagles in the Australian Football League (AFL). Additionally, he was recruited from West Perth in the WAFL with pick 26 in the 2010 AFL Draft.

Early life
Too young to enter the 2009 AFL Draft, he was predicted during the 2009 season to be a top-five draft pick, but some off-field incidents, including being suspended from his school and spending time in hospital following a fight at a nightclub, saw him slip to the first selection of the second round in the 2010 Draft.

AFL career
Darling made his AFL debut for West Coast against  in round 1, 2011, kicking 2 goals.

In round 6, Darling was nominated for the 2011 AFL Rising Star after an impressive 3 goal display against .

Darling was a part of West Coast's 2018 Premiership Side, which defeated Collingwood by 5 points in the 2018 Grand Final. He had a very quiet first half, failing to register a mark and having close to zero influence on the game. However, he turned that around in the third quarter and finished the game with 7 marks, 12 disposals and a goal, playing a pivotal role in helping West Coast achieve a remarkable comeback.

On 21 January 2022, the AFL's requirement for Western Australian-based players to get their first COVID-19 vaccine dose passed, with Darling being the only Western Australian player not to get his first vaccine dose. Until he gets vaccinated, he is not allowed to attend training or go to the club's headquarters at Lathlain Park. He remains on the team's list. The AFL required WA players to get their second dose by 18 February 2022, but the Western Australian government requires players get their second dose by 31 January 2022. In the 2023 pre-season, Darling sued Seven West for defamation over their coverage on Darling's alleged vaccine hesitancy.

Playing style
Whilst Darling predominantly played in the forward line early in his career, from 2014 onwards, he enjoyed stints in the midfield where he prospered in a tall half-forward role.

As a forward, Darling is renowned for his tackling pressure and goal sense. He often creates unlikely goal-scoring opportunities through his unrelenting pursuit of opposition defenders in possession of the ball.  His athleticism and endurance allow him to regularly find space from his opponents throughout the course of a game, and he continually strives to make himself a viable marking target inside his team's forward 50. He is just as effective on the ground as he is in the air. Darling has a black belt in martial arts and taekwondo, and often performs rapid lunges to propel himself from the ground using his hips and torso. His father, David, teaches martial arts as a discipline in Perth.

Jack Darling attracted comparisons to AFL greats Wayne Carey and Jonathan Brown.

Statistics
Statistics are correct to the end of round 13 2021

|- style="background:#EAEAEA"
| scope="row" text-align:center | 2011
| 
| 27 || 23 || 24 || 11 || 165 || 119 || 284 || 103 || 93 || 1.0 || 0.5 || 7.2 || 5.2 || 12.3 || 4.5 || 4.0
|-
| scope="row" text-align:center | 2012
| 
| 27 || 24 || 53 || 25 || 198 || 68 || 266 || 131 || 68 || 2.2 || 1.0 || 8.3 || 2.8 || 11.1 || 5.5 || 2.8
|- style="background:#EAEAEA"
| scope="row" text-align:center | 2013
| 
| 27 || 21 || 42 || 27 || 168 || 80 || 248 || 96 || 58 || 2.0 || 1.3 || 8.0 || 3.8 || 11.8 || 4.6 || 2.8
|-
| scope="row" text-align:center | 2014
| 
| 27 || 22 || 39 || 29 || 208 || 106 || 314 || 106 || 86 || 1.8 || 1.3 || 9.5 || 4.8 || 14.3 || 4.8 || 3.9
|- style="background:#EAEAEA"
| scope="row" text-align:center | 2015
| 
| 27 || 15 || 26 || 18 || 108 || 63 || 171 || 78 || 46 || 1.7 || 1.2 || 7.2 || 4.2 || 11.4 || 5.2 || 3.1
|-
| scope="row" text-align:center | 2016
| 
| 27 || 23 || 44 || 21 || 156 || 125 || 281 || 123 || 61 || 1.9 || 0.9 || 6.8 || 5.4 || 12.2 || 5.3 || 2.7
|- style="background:#EAEAEA"
| scope="row" text-align:center | 2017
| 
| 27 || 23 || 43 || 25 || 184 || 93 || 277 || 119 || 67 || 1.9 || 1.1 || 8.0 || 4.0 || 12.0 || 5.2 || 2.9
|-
|style="text-align:center;background:#afe6ba;"|2018†
| 
| 27 || 21 || 48 || 27 || 188 || 88 || 276 || 129 || 50 || 2.3 || 1.3 || 9.0 || 4.2 || 13.1 || 6.1 || 2.4
|- style="background:#EAEAEA"
| scope="row" text-align:center | 2019
| 
| 27 || 14 || 59 || 18 || 114 || 48 || 162 || 51 || 32 || 2.3 || 0.8 || 8.1 || 3.4 || 11.6 || 4.1 || 2.3
|- style="background:#EAEAEA; font-weight:bold; width:2em"
|- style="background:#EAEAEA"
| scope="row" text-align:center | 2020
| 
| 27 || 18 || 30 || 12 || 112 || 57 || 169 || 64 || 35 || 1.6 || 0.6 || 6.2 || 3.1 || 9.3 || 3.5 || 1.9
|-
|- style="background:#EAEAEA"
| scope="row" text-align:center | 2021
| 
| 27 || 13 || 29 || 12 || 110 || 56 || 166 || 76 || 30 || 2.2 || 0.9 || 8.4 || 4.3 || 12.7 || 5.8 || 2.3
|-
| scope="row" text-align:center class="sortbottom" colspan=3 | Career
| 227
| 437
| 218
| 1673
| 888
| 2561
| 1061
| 620
| 1.9
| 0.9
| 7.3
| 3.9
| 11.2
| 4.6
| 2.7
|}

References

External links

WAFL Online statistics

1992 births
West Coast Eagles players
West Coast Eagles Premiership players
West Perth Football Club players
Living people
Australian rules footballers from Western Australia
People educated at Sacred Heart College, Sorrento
Place of birth missing (living people)
All-Australians (AFL)
One-time VFL/AFL Premiership players